Southside Historic District is a national historic district located at Corning, Steuben County, New York. The district encompasses 624 contributing buildings, one contributing site and four contributing objects in a predominantly residential section of Corning. The district developed after 1835 and includes notable examples of Federal, Greek Revival, and Victorian architecture. Located in the district is the separately listed World War Memorial Library. Other notable buildings include the Steuben County Courthouse designed by J. Foster Warner, the "Voting Booth" (c. 1893-1898), Corning Free Academy (1922), the First United Methodist Church of Corning and Christ Episcopal Church.

It was listed on the National Register of Historic Places in 1998.

References

Corning, New York
Historic districts on the National Register of Historic Places in New York (state)
Federal architecture in New York (state)
Greek Revival architecture in New York (state)
Victorian architecture in New York (state)
Historic districts in Steuben County, New York
National Register of Historic Places in Steuben County, New York